Jørgen Zoëga (20 December 1755 – 10 February 1809) was a Danish scientist. 
He was noted for his work as  an archaeologist, numismatist and anthropologist.

Biography
Jørgen (Georg) Zoëga  was  born at Daler parish in Tønder Municipality  in Southern Jutland.
His father Vilhad Christian Zoëga (1721-1790), whose family came originally from Northern Italy,  was the parish priest at Møgeltønder Church (Møgeltønder kirke); his mother  Henriette Emilie Ottosdatter Clausen (ca 1735-1763) was daughter of the superintendent of Schackenborg Castle (Schackenborg Slot). His brother was botanist Johan Zoëga (1742-1788). 

As a boy Jørgen was taught at home and then attended the gymnasium in Altona. He went in 1773 to the University of Göttingen and later to Leipzig, studying philosophy and the Classics. Repeated journeys to Italy developed an interest in archaeology, which had awakened early in him. In 1782, thanks to the Danish minister Ove Høegh-Guldberg (1731–1808), he received for two years a pension from the State. From Vienna, where he studied under the celebrated numismatist Joseph Hilarius Eckhel 
(1737–1798), Zoëga went to Rome early in 1783. Through introductions he received here a kindly welcome from Stefano Borgia (1731–1804) then a prelate and later cardinal.

On his way home in 1784, Zoëga heard in Paris of the political overthrow of his patron Høegh-Guldberg. He therefore returned to Rome and took up permanent abode in that city. He had before this catalogued and exhaustively described  Cardinal Borgia's extensive collection of coins and Coptic manuscripts. The prelate now gave him strong support and Pope Pius VI granted him annual support. With the aid of influential friends, Zoëga also received permanent assistance from Denmark, and in 1790 was made an honorary member of the Royal Danish Academy of Fine Arts in Copenhagen. When his patron, Cardinal Borgia, was exiled from Rome in 1798, Zoëga, grateful for the cardinal's hospitality to Danes who had gone to Rome, obtained a pension for Borgia from the state revenues of Denmark.

From 1798, Zoëga was Danish consul at Rome and a member of the Royal Danish Academy of Fine Arts at Copenhagen. His work in numismatics led him to take up Egyptological and Coptic studies, which he conducted with success. By his power of penetration and sound judgment, he pointed out to later investigators the path to be followed in interpreting hieroglyphics.
In his work on the Rosetta Stone, French linguist and orientalist Silvestre de Sacy (1758–1838), highlighted a suggestion made by Jørgen Zoëga in 1797 that the foreign names in Egyptian hieroglyphic inscriptions might be written phonetically. This proved to be a very fruitful insight that eventually led to decipherment.

Zoega is regarded as an associate of  German art historian and archaeologist Johann Joachim Winckelmann (1717–1768) and  Italian antiquarian  Ennio Quirino Visconti (1751–1818) in establishing the basis for archaeological science. His services to learning were also acknowledged in foreign countries by his election in 1806 to membership in the Academies of Science at Berlin and Vienna. He died in Rome three years later.

Selected works 
 Nummi aegyptii imperatorii (Rome, 1787)
 De origine et usu obeliscorum (Rome, 1797)
 Bassorilievi antichi di Roma (2 vols., Rome, 1808), translated into German by Friedrich Gottlieb Welcker (1811)
 Catalogus codicum copticorum manuscriptorum, qui in museo Borgiano Velitris adservantu (Rome, 1810), a posthumous work.

He also wrote several treatises on classical archaeology, also translated into German by Welcker, Georg Zoegas Abhandlungen (Göttingen, 1817). A work on the topography of Rome was left unfinished in manuscript.

See also
Statue of Georg Zoëga

References

Oher sources 
Karen Ascani, Paola Buzi, Daniela Picchi   (2015) The Forgotten Scholar: Georg Zoëga (1755-1809) (Brill)

Further reading
 Daniela Williams, Bernhard Woytek "Zoëga studente di numismatica. Il soggiorno a Vienna (1782) e i contatti con Joseph Eckhel", in K. Ascani, P. Buzi, D. Picchi (eds) The Forgotten Scholar: Georg Zoëga (1755-1809). At the Dawn of Egyptology and Coptic Studies, Leiden - Boston 2015, pp. 101–110.
 Øjvind Andreasen (ed.), Georg Zoëga - Briefe und Dokumente, vol. I, Det Danske Sprog- og Litteraturselskab, Copenhagen, 1967. .
 Øjvind Andreasen og Karen Ascani (eds.), Georg Zoëga - Briefe und Dokumente, vol. II-V, Det Danske Sprog- og Litteraturselskab, 2013. .

1755 births
1809 deaths
People from Tønder Municipality
University of Göttingen alumni
Leipzig University alumni
Danish archaeologists
Danish numismatists
18th-century archaeologists
18th-century Danish scientists
18th-century Danish people
Danish emigrants to Italy